The Inter-Service Kart Championship is a karting competition run for teams and drivers serving in or otherwise associated with the RAF, Royal Navy and British Army. It was first staged in 2011, evolving out the RAF competitions that had been staged for many years, but which had long welcomed karters from the other services.

The Championship is normally held over six rounds between April and September each year, and runs two classes of racing which are usually both run during a race weekend. All events are run by the RAFMSA in conjunction with the RNRMMSA and BAMA under the jurisdiction of the MSA.

The Premier Class is for high-performance karts with two-stroke engines up to 125cc. A variety of engines may be used including KF2, Rotax FR125, Parilla Leopard, PRD Fireball, IAME EasyKart 125, TKM BT82, TKM K4S and Parilla Lynx/Lynx Maxi, as well as the classic 100cc. Racing is on an individual basis, with each event usually consisting of three qualifying heats (around 6 minutes each), followed by a slightly longer final (around 10 minutes). There are two championship categories: ‘Serving Military’ for serving military personnel, and 'Overall' for all drivers. The Wally Pape Trophy is awarded to the best novice during the season, whilst the RAF Individual Kart Championship for serving RAF personnel is also contested at a nominated round.

The Endurance Class is for twin-engined Honda GX-160 powered Pro-Karts and is where most new drivers start. Races are usually between two and three hours in duration, and involve teams representing stations, units and other formations. There are two championship categories: 'Serving Military' for teams entered by station and unit clubs, and 'Overall' for all teams. A Station/Unit Trophy is also contested between station and unit clubs.

Endurance Class Winners

External links 
 

Kart racing
Motorsport competitions in the United Kingdom